Uloža is a village and municipality in Levoča District in the Prešov Region of central-eastern Slovakia.

History
In historical records the village was first mentioned in 1280. Uloža was a village for people infected leprosy. Name of village is Uloža because word "bury" may be translated like "uložiť".

Geography
The municipality lies at an altitude of 870 metres and covers an area of  (2020-06-30/-07-01). Near of village is important holy shrine "Mariánska hora". To this church comes a lot of tourist every year.

Population 
It has a population of 219 people (2020-12-31).

References

External links
http://www.statistics.sk/mosmis/eng/run.html

Villages and municipalities in Levoča District